The El Salvador Under 20s football team, more commonly known as La Azulita, is controlled by Federación Salvadoreña de Fútbol and represents El Salvador in international Under 20 or youth football competitions.

Their first U-20 World Cup was at the 2013 FIFA U-20 World Cup, where they saw their first victory at a major FIFA tournament (outside of beach soccer) to Australia by 2–1, scored respectively by Diego Coca and José Peña.

Competitive record

FIFA U-20 World Cup Record

UNCAF preliminary round

1The games were forbidden by Concacaf due to El Salvador using an ineligible player

CONCACAF Under-20 Championship

Fixtures and results

Key
 F   = Friendly
 UF  = Unofficial Friendly
 U-20 CCQ = 2017 CONCACAF U-20 Championship qualifying
 U-20 CC = U-20 Championship
 U-20 WC = U-20 World Cup
 GS = Group Stage
 QF = Quarter-finals
 SF = Semi-finals
 Fi = Final
 PSO = Penalty shootout
 a.e.t. = After extra time
 El Salvador's scores listed first

Players

Current squad
 The following players were called up for the 2022 CONCACAF U-20 Championship.
 Match dates: 18 June – 3 July 2022
 Caps and goals correct as of: 19 June 2022
 Names in italics denote players who have been capped for the senior team.

Recent call-ups
The following players have been called up in the current U-20 cycle.

Former squads

2013 FIFA U-20 World Cup squad
Head coach: Mauricio Alfaro 

Personnel

Current staff
Info may be outdated

Manager History
  Conrado Miranda (1964, 1979)
  Raul Magana (1985,1994)
  Carlos Recinos (2000–2001)
  Ricardo Herrera (2002–2003)
  Cesar Acevedo (2004–2005)
  José Luis Rugamas (2006–2007)
  Norberto Huezo (2008–2009)
  Mauricio Alfaro (2009–2015)
  Eduardo Lara (2016–2017)
  Alexsander Rodriguez (2017–2018)
  Ernesto Gochez (2018-2020)
  Gerson Perez (2021-2022)
  TBD (2023-present)

Record versus other nations
Records for competitive matches only.
As of 01-22-15

Honours
CONCACAF U-20 ChampionshipWinners (1)''': 1964
Third Place (2): 1984, 2013

See also
El Salvador national football team
El Salvador national under-17 football team
El Salvador national under-21 football team
El Salvador national under-23 football team
CONCACAF Under-20 Championship

References

External links
Federación Salvadoreña de Fútbol Official Site (Spanish)
El Salvador national football team (Non-Official Site) (Spanish)

under-20
Central American national under-20 association football teams